is one of ten wards of the city of Saitama, in Saitama Prefecture, Japan, and is located in the southeastern part of the city. , the ward had an estimated population of 129,705 and a population density of 4,900 persons per km².

Geography
A wide area of green farmland, Minuma Rice Paddies, forms the central part of the ward. The major river system includes the Shiba River, the Ayanose River, and the Minuma Irrigational Canal. In the southern section of the ward runs the Tōhoku Expressway.

Neighboring Municipalities
Saitama Prefecture
Minuma-ku
Minami-ku
Urawa-ku
Iwatsuki-ku
Kawaguchi

History
The first people who stayed permanently in this area are considered to have arrived approximately twenty five thousand years ago.

On April 1, 1932 Tanida was annexed by Urawa Town, which was elevated to city status on February 11, 1934. Omagi, Mimuro and Daimon merged to form the village of Misono on April 1, 1956. Misono was subsequently divided between Urawa and Kawaguchi on May 1, 1962. On May 1, 2001 the cities of Urawa, Yono and Ōmiya merged to form the new city of Saitama. When Saitama was proclaimed a designated city in 2003, the much area of corresponding to former villages of Tanida, Omagi, Mimuro and Daimon became Midori Ward.

Education
Urawa University
Keio University School of Pharmacy
Akenohoshi Women's Junior College
 Midori-ku has 10 elementary schools, six junior high schools, and three high schools, as well as two special education schools.

Municipal junior high schools:

 Harayama (原山中学校)
 Higashi Urawa (東浦和中学校)
 Mimuro (三室中学校)
 Misono (美園中学校)
 Misono Minami (美園南中学校)
 Omagi (尾間木中学校)

Municipal elementary schools:

 Daimon (大門小学校)
 Harayama (原山小学校)
 Mimuro (三室小学校)
 Misono (美園小学校)
 Misono Kita (美園北小学校)
 Nakao (中尾小学校)
 Noda (野田小学校)
 Omagi (尾間木小学校)
 Omaki (大牧小学校)
 Saido (道祖土小学校)
 Shibahara (芝原小学校)

Transportation

Railway
 JR East – Musashino Line 
 
  Saitama Rapid Railway Line

Highway
  – Urawa Interchange
   Shuto Expressway Saitama Shintoshin Route

Local attractions

 Saitama Stadium 2002
 ÆON Urawa Misono shopping mall
 Saitama Prefectural Urawa Museum
 Saitama Municipal Urawa Museum

References

External links

 

Wards of Saitama (city)